Alfred Vogt (31 October 1879 – 10 December 1943) was a Swiss ophthalmologist, known for his development of techniques for retinoscopy and the surgical management of retinal detachment.

Alfred Vogt received his doctorate from the University of Basel in 1904. After training in ophthalmology under professor Karl Mellinger in Basel, Vogt started private practice in 1906. In 1909 he was appointed head physician of the ophthalmological department of the cantonal hospital in the city of Aarau. In 1917 he was appointed professor extraordinarius and director of the University of Basel's eye clinic. In 1923 he was appointed professor ordinarius and director of the University of Zurich's eye clinic.

Vogt was a pioneer of specular microscopy; around 1913 he used a slit lamp together with a corneal microscope to investigate the structures of the anterior areas of the eye, and in 1918 he was the first to perform direct examination of the corneal endothelium. He is also credited with introducing perforating cyclodiathermy for the treatment of glaucoma (in 1936).

Awards and honors
 1919 Election to the Leopoldina
 1932 Donders Medal of the Dutch Ophthalmological Society
 1939 Cothenius Medial of the Leopoldina
 1941 Gonin Medal
 1942 Gullstrand Medal of the Swedish Medical Society

Selected works
 Damage to the Eye caused by Aniline Dye.
 Atlas der Spaltlampenmikroskopie des lebenden Auges. Berlin, J. Springer, 1921.
 2nd edition in 2 volumes. Springer, 1930–1931
 3rd volume. F. Enke, 1942.
 English translation Handbook and Atlas of the Slit Lamp Microscopy of the Living Eye in 3 volumes, Zürich, 1947.
 New printing of the 2nd edition (in German), Bonn, J. P. Wayenborgh, 1977.
 English translation Textbook and Atlas of the Slit Lamp Microscopy of the Living Eye by F. C. Blodi, 3 volumes, Bonn, J. P. Wayenborgh, 1978–1981
 French translation, Italian translation.

Eponyms
Anterior crocodile shagreen of Vogt
Palisades of Vogt
Striae of Vogt
Vogt–Koyanagi–Harada disease
Vogt's triad: seen in glaucoma, shouldn't be confused with "Vogt's triad" seen in tuberous sclerosis which is named after the German neurologist Heinrich Vogt.

References

1879 births
1943 deaths
Swiss ophthalmologists
Academic staff of the University of Basel
Academic staff of the University of Zurich
People from Kulm District